Oriente ("East") was the easternmost province of Cuba until 1976. The term "Oriente" is still used to refer to the eastern part of the country, which currently is divided into five different provinces. Fidel and Raúl Castro were born in a small town in this province (Birán).

The origins of Oriente lie in the 1607 division of Cuba into a western and eastern administration. The eastern part was governed from Santiago de Cuba and it was subordinate to the national government in Havana. In 1807, Cuba was divided into three departamentos: Occidental, Central and Oriental. This arrangement lasted until 1851, when the central department was merged back into the West. In 1878, Cuba was divided into six provinces. Oriente remained intact but was officially renamed to Santiago de Cuba Province until the name was reverted to Oriente in 1905. This lasted until 1976, when the province was split into five different provinces: Las Tunas Province, Granma Province, Holguín Province, Santiago de Cuba Province, and Guantánamo Province. This administrative change was proclaimed by Cuban Law Number 1304 of July 3, 1976, and remains in place to this day.

History
Diego Velazquez founded the capital of Oriente province in 1514 and named it Santiago de Cuba. The province comprises 22 municipalities and is Cuba's largest province containing about one third of the country's population. Oriente Province is in the most eastern region of Cuba with a population of 1,797,606. It stretches across  and consists of various mountain ranges with the Sierra Maestra region having Cuba's highest mountain peak and elevation in Pico Turquino. Oriente Province is the cradle of much of Cuba's history being the place of Fidel and Raul Castro's birth. José Martí was killed in battle in Dos Ríos and many guerrilla wars have also taken place in Oriente. Cuba's first guerilla-style war was in 1523. against the advancing Spaniards in the Sierra Maestra Mountains. Some of Cuba's oldest cities are in Oriente Province (such as Baracoa) and carry a rich history of Cuba's struggle for independence and racial equality.

Throughout the 1800s a significant number of enslaved African people were brought to Cuba to work at the sugar mills, although some were brought from Haiti and other neighboring islands because they were also cheap and efficient labor. Open warfare broke out after an independence movement and lasted from 1867 to 1878. Slavery was finally abolished in 1886, but life for many Afro-Cubans remains a struggle, especially in Oriente Province.

After the occupation of the Spanish ended in 1899, Oriente Province became a refuge for Afro-Cubans. Oriente had the highest number of individual land owners and renters with 96% of the population being native-born. Afro-Cubans constituted as many as 26% of the land workers. Of the total land owned by Afro-Cubans, 75% were in Oriente Province. Even though Afro-Cubans fared better in Oriente, poverty was still rampant in the province and they remained oppressed by wealthy Cubans and foreign land owners.

Sugar and coffee were the main agricultural products produced. And at the highest there were forty-one sugar mills spread throughout the region. Foreign investors saw opportunity within the province and began to buy as much land as possible to increase sugar production. As investors bought land, local farmers were pushed out and frustration increased. Poverty grew and by May 1912 Cubans in Oriente Province had reached a boiling point. Massive demonstrations erupted and Afro-Cubans began to loot and burn businesses and property owned by foreign investors. In response, the Cuban government sent in the army to burn the property of the Afro-Cubans and slaughtered many. Within two years, half of the sugar mills in Oriente were owned by U.S. investors. For Cubans working within the province, life had become near unbearable. The presence of Americans, Jamaicans, Bahamians and Haitians, brought in by the United Fruit Company exacerbated racial problems not present until the U.S. occupation of 1898. Cuba's national hero, José Martí called for a multiracial republic.

List of governors

1500–1799

 1511 Diego Velázquez de Cuéllar
 1528 Pedro de Barba
 1532 Gonzalo Ñuño de Guzmán
 1538 Juan de Rojas; Isabel de Bobadilla
 1539 Hernando de Soto 
 1545 Juan de Avila 
 1547 Antonio de Chávez 
 1549 Gonzalo Pérez de Angulo
 1550 Juan de Hinestrosa 
 1554 Diego de Mazariegos
 1565 García Osorio
 1567 Diego de Ribera y Cepero
 1568 Francisco de Zayas; Pedro Menéndez de Airlés
 1570 Pedro Vázquez Valdés
 1571 Juan Alonso de Navia
 1574 Sancho Pardo Osorio
 1576 Gabriel de Montalvo
 1577 Diego de Soto
 1578 Juan Carreño
 1580 Gaspar de Torres
 1584 Gabriel Luján
 1586 Pedro Vega de la Guerra
 1589 Juan Tejada
 1596 Juan Maldonado
 1602 Pedro Valdés
 1608 Juan de Villaverde Ozeta
 1609 Juan Ortiz
 1614 Juan García de Navia 
 1618 Rodrigo de Velazco 
 1625 Pedro Fonseca Betancourt 
 1627 Alonso Cabrera 
 1630 Juan Acevedo 
 1632 Juan de Amézqueta Quijano 
 1633 Pedro de la Roca y Borgés 
 1643 Bartolomé Osuna 
 1649 Diego Felipe Ribera 
 1654 Pedro Bayona Villanueva 
 1659 Pedro Morales 
 1662 Francisco de la Vega 
 1663 Juan Bravo Acuña 
 1664 Pedro Bayona Villanueva
 1670 Andrés de Magaña 
 1678 Francisco de la Vega  
 1683 Gil Correoso Catalán 
 1688 Tomás Pizarro Cortés 
 1690 Juan Villalobos 
 1691 Alvaro Romero Venegas 
 1692 Sebastián Arencibia Isasi 
 1698 Mateo Palacio Saldurtum  
 1700 Juan, Barón de Chaves 
 1708 José Canales 
 1711 Luis Sañudo Asay 
 1712 Mateo de Cangas 
 1713 Carlos Sucre 
 1728 Juan del Hoyo; Pedro Ignacio Jiménez 
 1738 Francisco A Cagigal 
 1747 Lorenzo de Arcos y Moreno 
 1754 Lorenzo Madariaga 
 1765 Marqués de Casa Cagigal 
 1770 Esteban de Olaris 
 1772 Juan Antonio Ayauz de Ureta 
 1776 José Teutor 
 1779 Antonio de Salas 
 1781 Vicente Manuel de Céspedes 
 1782 Nicolás de Arredondo
 1788 Juan Bautista Vaillant 
 1796 Juan Nepomuceno Quintana 
 1798 Isidoro de Limonta 
 1799 Sebastián Kindelán

1800–1902

 1800 Pedro Alcántara de Urbina 
 1814 Pedro Celestino Duharte; Antonio Mozo de la Torre 
 1816 Eusebio Escudero 
 1821 Marqués de San Felipe y Santiago 
 1822 Juan de Moya; Gabriel de Torres y Velasco 
 1824 Juan de Moya 
 1825 Francisco de Yllas 
 1826 Juan de Moya; Isidro Barradas; Francisco de Yllas 
 1828 Juan de Moya 
 1830 Francisco de Yllas 
 1831 Juan de Moya
 1834 José Santos de la Hera; Fernando Cacho
 1835 Manuel Lorenzo
 1837 Santiago Fortuns; Juan de Moya; Tomás Yarto
 1839 Joaquín Escario; Pedro Becerra 
 1840 Juan Tello 
 1843 Cayetano Urbina 
 1846 Gregorio Piquero
 1847 José Mac-Crohón
 1851 Joaquín del Manzano
 1852 Joaquín Martínez de Medinilla
 1854 Marqués de España
 1855 Carlos de Vargas Machuca
 1859 Primo de Rivera
 1860 Antonio López de Letona
 1862 José Colubrí Massort
 1863 José Ramón de la Gándara
 1864 Casimiro de la Muela; Blas Villate de la Hera, Conde de Valmaseda
 1865 Marqués de la Concordia; Juan de Ojeda; José del Villar y Flores
 1866 Juan de Ojeda; José del Villar
 1867 Juan de Ojeda; Ramón Vivanco y León; Joaquín Ravenet y Morantes
 1868 Juan de Ojeda; Fructuoso García Muñoz
 1869 Simón de la Torre y Orsuaza; Juan de Ojeda; Félix Ferrer y Mora; Blas Villate, Conde de Valmaseda
 1870 Juan de Ojeda; Conde de Valmaseda; José Melero y Calvo; Zacarías González Goyeneche
 1871 Carlos Palanca y Gutiérrez
 1872 Arsenio Martínez de Campo; Luis Riquelme; Adolfo Morales de los Ríos
 1873 Juan García Navarro; Sabas Marín; Adolfo Morales de los Ríos; Juan Nepomuceno Burriel
 1874 Juan Nepomuceno Burriel 
 1875 Sabas Marín 
 1876 Ramón Menduiña 
 1877 José Sáenz de Tejada; Enrique Bargés y Pombo; Luis Prendergast y Gordón; Camilo Polavieja; Andrés González Muñoz 
 1878 Luis Daban y Ramírez de Arellano 
 1880 Luis M de Pando; Camilo Polavieja; Emilio March y García 
 1881 Camilo Polavieja; Emilio March y García 
 1885 Luis M de Pando; Antonio Molto y Díaz-Bario; Francisco Acosta Alvear 
 1887 Santos Pérez y Ruiz; Alvaro Suárez Valdés 
 1889 Luis Izquierdo Roldán; Andrés González Muñoz; Ramón Barrio y Ruiz Vidal
 1890 Francisco Javier Obregón
 1891 Andrés González Muñoz; Leopoldo Barrios Carrión
 1892 Andrés González Muñoz; Francisco Rodríguez del Rey; José Blanco y González Calderón; Rafael Suero Marcoleta; Antonio Gálvez y González 
 1893 Rafael Suero Marcoleta; Agustín Bravo y Jóven; Enrique Capriles y Osuna 
 1895 Sebastián Kindelán y Griñau; Jorge Garrich y Allo; José Giménez y Moreno 
 1897 Carlos Denis y Trueba; Juan A Vinent y Kindelán; Federico Ordax y Avecilla; Enrique Capriles 
 1898 Francisco Oliveiros y Jiménez; Enrique Capriles; Leonardo Ros y Rodríguez; Leonardo Wood
 1902 Samuel Whiteside

Municipalities

Present day municipalities that were part of Oriente include:

Granma Province

Guantánamo Province

Holguín Province

Las Tunas Province

Santiago de Cuba Province

See also
 Timeline of Santiago de Cuba (city)

References

Bibliography

 
  (3 volumes)
 
  (fulltext)

External links

Baracoa
Guantanamo

Former provinces of Cuba
17th-century establishments in Cuba
1976 disestablishments in Cuba
States and territories established in 1879